The Gigantium (called Sparekassen Danmark Arena for sponsoring reasons), in Aalborg, Denmark, is a large, rentable faire building, which hosts a large variety of concerts, markets and exhibitions, among other things.

It has a capacity of 5,000 people. For concerts, the capacity is 8,500 people. In addition, there is an ice rink/arena for training purposes, a swimming pool and an athletics hall within the sports complex. The main arena building was severely damaged by a fire on 5 July 2017.

Tenants

The main use of the arena is sport, and it is home to the Danish Handball League club Aalborg Håndbold and the elite Ice Hockey team Aalborg Pirates.

The ice hockey club AaB Ishockey also play their matches in an ice arena connected to the original Gigantium arena. AaB Ishockey is the amateur club having the license for professional ice hockey being used by Aalborg Pirates.

Events
Among many other events, the arena hosted Dansk Melodi Grand Prix, the Danish National Selection show for the Eurovision Song Contest in 2006, 2010, 2012, 2015 and 2018, and was a candidate host venue for the Eurovision Song Contest 2014, but withdrew because of the city of Aalborg did not live up to the minimum requirements of having a minimum of 3000 hotel rooms available for fans and delegations coming to the contest.

See also
List of indoor arenas in Denmark
List of indoor arenas in Nordic countries

References

External links

Gigantium 

Aalborg Boldspilklub
Buildings and structures in Aalborg
Indoor ice hockey venues in Denmark
Handball venues in Denmark
Indoor arenas in Denmark
Sport in Aalborg